Şehzade Mahmud (1587, Manisa Palace, Manisa - 7 June 1603, Constantinople) was an Ottoman prince, the son of Sultan Mehmed III and Halime Sultan. He was the grandson of Sultan Murad III and Safiye Sultan, the half-brother of the future sultan Ahmed I and the brother of Mustafa I.

Early life
Şehzade Mahmud was born in Manisa Palace, when his father was still a prince, and the governor of the Saruhan Sanjak. His mother was Halime Sultan. Mahmud along with his brothers was educated by Mustafa Efendi, who was appointed by Mehmed in 1592. When Murad died in 1595, Şehzade Mehmed ascended the throne as Mehmed III, Mahmud came to Istanbul with his father. Upon ascending the throne, his father ordered the execution of his nineteen half brothers.

In Istanbul
In Istanbul, Mahmud was very popular with the Janissaries. Mehmed was disturbed by Mahmud’s eagerness to leave the palace and take up the role of warrior prince, especially since he himself had grown so fat that he could not campaign. Hoping to dispel his father’s worries over provincial rebellions and Safavid advances, Mahmud would ask his father to send him, and give him the command of the army. Whenever he spoke like that, Ahmed would try unsuccessfully to stop him because this made Mehmed distressful. Furthermore, Mehmed feared that the youth intended to mount a rebellion against him from within the palace.

Mahmud became grievous to see how his father was altogether led by Safiye Sultan, his grandmother and the state was going into ruin. His mother was also not favoured by Safiye. According to Turkish tradition all princes were expected to work as provincial governors (Sanjak-bey) as a part of their training. However, Mahmud, being too young, was not yet circumcised, nor was sent to govern any province because of the outgoing Jelali revolts and the long Turkish War, an indecisive land war between the Habsburg monarchy and the Ottoman Empire, primarily over the Principalities of Wallachia, Transylvania and Moldavia.

Rumors of conspiracy to poison Mehmed in order to bring Mahmud to the command of the empire were spreading in the capital. Discussion took place among the viziers of the imperial council as to which of the sultan’s sons should be designated heir to the throne. The viziers were divided into two groups, one supporting Mahmud, the other favoring his brother Şehzade Ahmed. According to another rumor, if the conspiracy to assassinate the sultan failed, Mahmud would be secretly taken to a province, where he could easily gather an army and fight for the throne.

Moreover, Mahmud's mother sent a message to a religious seer, for she was superstitious, to know if her son would become the next Sultan, and how long her husband would reign. The man answered, but the message was intercepted by Abdürrezzak Agha, the chief black eunuch of the imperial harem, and who later gave it to Mehmed and Safiye, instead of her. The message said that Mehmed would die within six months, whether by death or deposition, and her son will become the next Sultan. Safiye incensed Mehmed, and he had Mahmud examined, who indeed knew nothing of his mother's action.

Imprisonment
Mahmud was imprisoned, and beaten to make him confess. After two days, he was beaten again, every time being struck two hundred blows but nothing came out. Then his mother was called in to be questioned and examined, who confessed that she did send a message to the religious seer to know about her son's fortune, but without any intention of hurt or thought of the deprivation of her husband. But this statement did not satisfy Mehmed and his mother, Safiye.

The Sultan decided to consult with his grand vizier Yemişçi Hasan Pasha and the mufti on the issue. He demanded a legal opinion from Mufti Ebulmeyamin Mustafa Efendi, whether he could execute his son or not. The mufti gave the opinion that he cannot execute his son without any witnesses, and could only be executed on the ground that his death would satisfy his father.

Execution
Mahmud was executed on 7 June 1603 by four deaf mutes in a harem room while Mehmed III waited outside. After his order was carried out, Mehmed entered the room to make sure that Mahmud was dead. After Mahmud's death, Mehmed's only two sons left were the future Sultans Ahmed I and Mustafa I. His followers who were supposed to be involved in the matter were thrown into the sea. It was rumored that his mother was also executed. However, she was sent to the Eski (old) Palace by the end of June. After his death, Mahmud was remembered as courageous and jealous, and joined the category of those who were much loved by the janissaries, an Ottoman way of posthumously describing ambitious princes who did not make it.

Aftermath
Mehmed died on 22 December just six and a half months later. According to a source the cause of Mehmed's death was distress caused by Mahmud's death. Mehmed's son, Mahmud's half-brother Ahmed ascended the throne as Sultan Ahmed I. Mahmud who had been buried firstly obscurely, was honored with burial in a tomb built on the orders of his brother Ahmed, in Şehzade Mosque, Istanbul. Ahmed also sent Safiye Sultan to the Eski (old) Palace on Friday January 1604, along with his brother Mustafa. He also replaced the chief black eunuch of the imperial harem, Abdürrezzak Agha, with a new one Cevher Agha, because of his role in Mahmud's execution.

In popular culture
In the 2015 TV series Muhteşem Yüzyıl: Kösem, Şehzade Mahmud is portrayed by as a child by Turkish actor Arda Taşarcan, and as adult by Turkish actor Barış Cankurtaran.

Notes

References

Sources

Further reading

External links
 Şehzade Mahmud in Turkish
 Sarayın koridorlarında bir şehzadenin çığlığı

16th-century Ottoman royalty
1580s births
1603 deaths
Executed people from the Ottoman Empire
17th-century executions by the Ottoman Empire
Royalty from Istanbul
Executed royalty